Hepacivirus is a genus of positive-strand RNA viruses in the family Flaviviridae. The hepatitis C virus (HCV), in species Hepacivirus C, infects humans and is associated with hepatitis and hepatocellular carcinoma. There are fourteen species in the genus which infect a range of other vertebrate.

History
Hepatitis C virus (HCV), which is the causative agent of hepatitis C in humans, and a member of the species Hepacivirus C, was discovered in 1989. Seven genotypes (1–7) and eighty-six subtypes (1a, 1b etc.) of hepatitis C virus have been named.

GBV-B virus (also known as GB virus B) discovered in 1995 is capable of infecting New World monkeys, in particular tamarins. Like HCV it is transmitted by the blood-borne route and similar to HCV it is associated with the viral hepatitis. However GBV-B has never been identified in wild animals and its natural host is not known.

Structure
Viruses in the genus Hepacivirus are enveloped and have spherical icosahedral-like geometries with pseudo T=3 symmetry. The virus particle diameter is around 50 nm. Genomes are linear, non-segmented, and around 10,000 nucleotides in length.

Life cycle
Entry into the host cell is achieved by attachment of the viral envelope protein E to host receptors, which mediates clathrin-mediated endocytosis. Replication follows the positive-strand RNA virus replication model. Positive strand RNA virus transcription is the method of transcription. Translation takes place by viral initiation. Humans and other vertebrate serve as the natural host. Transmission routes are sexual, blood, and contact.

Taxonomy

In the genus Hepacvirus there are 14 species:

{{columns-list|colwidth=25em|
 Hepacivirus A  (canine hepacivirus, equine hepacivirus)
 Hepacivirus B'' (GBV-B)
 Hepacivirus C (hepatitis C virus)
 Hepacivirus D (Guereza hepacivirus)
 Hepacivirus E (rodent hepacivirus-339)
 Hepacivirus F (rodent hepacivirus-NLR07-oct70)
 Hepacivirus G (Norway rat hepacivirus 1)
 Hepacivirus H (Norway rat hepacivirus 2)
 Hepacivirus I (rodent hepacivirus-SAR-3/RSA/2008)
 Hepacivirus J (rodent hepacivirus-RMU10-3382/GER/2010)
 Hepacivirus K (bat hepacivirus-PDB-829)
 Hepacivirus L (bat hepacivirus-PDB-112)
 Hepacivirus M (bat hepacivirus-PDB-491.1)
 Hepacivirus N (bovine hepacivirus)
}}

Additional information
Additional hepaciviruses have been described from bats, rodents including bank voles, horses, and dogs. Rodent hepacivirus is found in the deer mouse (Peromyscus maniculatus). A virus related to hepaciviruses is found in bamboo rat (Rhizomys pruinosus). A virus related to hepaciviruses infects the long-tailed ground squirrel Spermophilus undulatus.Cattle are a host for viruses of the species Hepacivirus N. The viruses most closely related to Hepacivirus C are the equine hepaciviruses of the species Hepacivirus A. There are at least two subtypes of equine hepacivirus. Hepacivirus A infecting horses has also been found in donkeys.

A virus related to the hepaciviruses has been isolated from bald eagles (Haliaeetus leucocephalus).  Another unclassified virus in this taxon is duck hepacivirus-like virus.  A virus related to hepaciviruses has been isolated from the graceful catshark (Proscyllium habereri''). The virus – Jogalong virus – has been described that appears to belong to another species in this genus.

References

External links
 ICTV Report: Flaviviridae
 Viralzone: Hepacivirus
 Virus Pathogen Database and Analysis Resource (ViPR): Flaviviridae

 
Virus genera